= Sohan P. Modak =

Indian embryologist

Sohan P. Modak is an Indian embryologist and evolutionary bioinformatician.

He has a doctorate from the University of Geneva and did post-doctoral work at Oak Ridge National Laboratory and University of Kentucky, Lexington (USA). He served as staff scientist at the Swiss Institute for Experimental Cancer Research (1970–77), Visiting professor at the Ohio State University and Scientist-Engineer at French Center for Nuclear Energy Grenoble (1978–79). In 1979, he joined the University of Poona as Professor. He founded the Biotechnology Training Programme, NCCS, Bioinformatics-DIS. Sohan was Professor Emeritus at the Karnatak University, Dharwad (2001–03) and G.N. Ramachandran Sr. Res.Fellow at the IGIB Delhi (2005-2008). He published research in Developmental Neurobiology, Molecular Biology and Genomics . He now mentors studies on Molecular Evolution.

After his retirement as a head of the department of Zoology from University of Pune, where he studied embryology, and also conceived and developed Department of Biotechnology (UoP) and National Facility for Animal Tissue and Cell Culture (NFATCC which later became NCCS, Pune), he was appointed as a G.N. Ramchandran Fellow at IGIB, New Delhi. He then continued his interest in research on classification and evolutionary 3D tree building that utilized more than a single gene. His notable discoveries include the demonstration of chick lens cell degeneration during normal development, which has later been termed apoptosis, and molecular phylogeny in 3D.

== Publications ==
His most cited papers are:

- G.B. Price, S.P. Modak, T. Makinodan "Age-associated changes in the DNA of mouse tissue" in Science, 5 March 1971: Vol. 171, no. 3974, pp. 917-920. Google Scholar shows it has had 234 citations.
- D.W. Appleby, S.P. Modak. "DNA degradation in terminally differentiating lens fiber cells from chick embryo" in Proceedings of the National Academy of Sciences, USA, Vol.74, No.12, pp. 5579-5583, December 1977. Google Scholar shows it has had 136 citations.
